Cristian Damián Battocchio (born 10 February 1992) is a professional footballer who plays as a midfielder for Israeli Premier League club Sektzia Ness Ziona. Born in Argentina, he represented Italy at several youth international levels.

Club career

Udinese
Born in Rosario, Argentina, Battocchio arrived at Italian club Udinese in 2009 at the age of 16 from Newell's Old Boys in Argentina for a transfer fee of €200,000 In the 2010–11 season he became the captain of the youth team of Udinese. On 27 February 2011, he made his debut with the first team of Udinese against Palermo In a historic 7–0 victory for Udinese, coming on from the bench after the game had already been won.

On 29 September 2011, he made his second appearance with the first team in the UEFA Europa League competition, facing Celtic in a 1–1 draw. before the match his first team  coach Francesco Guidolin said that Battocchio was now ready for the first team and compared him to David Pizarro, Johan Walem, the youth coach of Udinese, said "he is now stable for the first team, has important qualities: vision of the game, a good foot, kick the penalties. He can do well as deep-lying playmaker".

Watford
On 30 August 2012, Battocchio was loaned to Watford, with Watford having the choice to purchase him at the end of the deal. Battocchio played in Watford's 4–0 win over Huddersfield on 19 January, and scored Watford's final goal – his first for the club – with a lovely finish from a beautiful team move which has been described as one of the best team goals ever at Vicarage Road. This goal won Watford "Goal Of The Season" as voted by the fans and Battocchio was awarded the trophy. Battocchio then scored his second goal for Watford against Blackpool on 9 March 2013.

Battocchio signed for Watford on a permanent basis on 19 July 2013, with the contract running for a period of three years until 2016. Battocchio scored his first league goal as a permanent Watford player in a 1–0 win at home to Wigan Athletic on 28 September 2013.

Loan to Virtus Entella
After falling down the pecking order under then Watford manager Beppe Sannino, Battocchio moved on a season-long loan to Serie B side Virtus Entella on 26 August 2014.

Brest
Battocchio left Watford in the summer of 2015, signing a two-year deal at Stade Brestois 29 on 11 August 2015.

Maccabi Tel Aviv
On 10 July 2017, Battocchio signed a two-year contract at Maccabi Tel Aviv with an option to extend for another year.

Return to Brest
On 19 January 2019, Battocchio signed to Brest for the second time. On 3 December 2019, he scored his first Brest goals (and Brest's first top-flight hat-trick in almost 29 years) in a 5-0 win over RC Strasbourg.

Tokushima Vortis
On 4 February 2021, Battochio signed with Japanese side Tokushima Vortis.

UNAM
In the summer of 2021, Battocchio arrived in Mexico City for a nice vacation, hired by Pumas UNAM.

International career
On 9 October 2011, Battocchio was called up to the Italy U20 squad by coach Luigi Di Biagio. He went on to play for Italy at U21 level.

Career statistics

Club

References

External links
 

1992 births
Living people
Italian footballers
Footballers from Rosario, Santa Fe
Argentine footballers
Udinese Calcio players
Watford F.C. players
Virtus Entella players
Stade Brestois 29 players
Maccabi Tel Aviv F.C. players
Tokushima Vortis players
Club Universidad Nacional footballers
Volos N.F.C. players
Sektzia Ness Ziona F.C. players
Italian expatriate footballers
Serie A players
English Football League players
Serie B players
Ligue 1 players
Ligue 2 players
Israeli Premier League players
J1 League players
Liga MX players
Super League Greece players
Argentine expatriate footballers
Expatriate footballers in Italy
Expatriate footballers in England
Expatriate footballers in France
Expatriate footballers in Israel
Expatriate footballers in Japan
Expatriate footballers in Mexico
Expatriate footballers in Greece
Italian expatriate sportspeople in England
Italian expatriate sportspeople in France
Italian expatriate sportspeople in Israel
Italian expatriate sportspeople in Japan
Italian expatriate sportspeople in Mexico
Italian expatriate sportspeople in Greece
Argentine expatriate sportspeople in Italy
Argentine expatriate sportspeople in England
Argentine expatriate sportspeople in France
Argentine expatriate sportspeople in Israel
Argentine expatriate sportspeople in Japan
Argentine expatriate sportspeople in Mexico
Argentine expatriate sportspeople in Greece
Association football midfielders
Italy youth international footballers
Italy under-21 international footballers
Italian sportspeople of Argentine descent
Argentine people of Italian descent
Sportspeople of Italian descent